Dubois-Kierstede Stone House is one of several historic stone buildings in Saugerties, New York. It was built in 1727 and modified over the years.  It is currently the home of the Saugerties Historical Society, which operates the structure as the Kiersted House Museum. In 2001, the society received a $150k grant to further restore the building. The house was listed in the National Register of Historic Places in 1998.

References

External links
Saugerties Historical Society
CometoSaugerties.com

Houses in Ulster County, New York
National Register of Historic Places in Ulster County, New York
Houses completed in 1727
Saugerties, New York
Museums in Ulster County, New York
Historic house museums in New York (state)